Carlos Henrique Kroeber (1934–1999) was a Brazilian film and television actor.

Filmography

Movies 

1968: O Homem que Comprou o Mundo
1969: Navalha na Carne
1970: É Simonal
1971: A Casa Assassinada .... Timóteo
1971: Rua Descalça
1972: Os Inconfidentes .... Alvarenga Peixoto
1972: Som Amor e Curtição
1973: Os Primeiros Momentos
1973: Joanna Francesa .... Aureliano
1974: Um Homem Célebre
1974: O Marginal .... Marcito
1974: Motel
1974: O Filho do Chefão
1974: Guerra Conjugal .... João Bicha
1975: Quem Tem Medo de Lobisomem?.... Leão
1975: O Casamento .... Padre Bernardo
1975: O Padre que Queria Pecar
1975: As Loucuras de um Sedutor
1975: A Extorsão .... Machado
1976: Um Brasileiro Chamado Rosaflor
1976: Tem Alguém na Minha Cama
1976: Soledade, a Bagaceira
1976: Gordos e Magros .... Carlão / Carlinhos
1976: Feminino plural
1977: Gente Fina É Outra Coisa
1977: Anchieta, José do Brasil
1978: O bandido Antonio Do
1979: Muito Prazer
1979: Massacre em Caxias
1980: Bye Bye Brazil .... Caminhoneiro
1981: Bonitinha mas Ordinária .... Dr. Werneck
1982: Luz del Fuego .... Trancoso
1982: Tessa, a Gata .... Raul
1984: Quilombo .... Tourinho
1984: Noites do Sertão .... Sô Liodoro
1984: O Cavalinho Azul .... Gigante
1985: Chico Rei .... Governador
1986: Vera .... Director of the Institution
1986: Por Incrível que Pareça
1987: Running Out of Luck
1988: Jardim de Alah
1989: Minas-Texas .... Dr. Rodrigo
1990: The 5th Monkey .... Mr. Garcia

Television 

1976: Estúpido Cupido .... Frei Damasceno
1978: O pulo do gato .... Pacheco
1979: Pai Herói .... Tiago
1980: As três Marias .... Olímpio
1981: Baila Comigo .... Gerente de banco
1981: Terras do sem fim .... Sinhô Badaró
1982: Sétimo Sentido .... Antônio Rivoredo
1982: Sol de Verão .... Hilário
1983: Guerra dos Sexos .... Moisés
1984: Transas e caretas .... Dom Manuel
1984: Amor com Amor Se Paga .... Anselmo
1985: Um Sonho a Mais .... Pedro Ernesto
1985: O Tempo e o Vento .... Nepomuceno
1986: Roda de Fogo .... Werner Benson
1986: Cambalacho .... Delegado
1987: Mandala .... Dr. Henrique
1988: Fera Radical .... Dr. Nogueira
1989: Que Rei Sou Eu? .... Dom Curro de la Grana
1989: O Sexo dos Anjos .... Nascimento
1989: República .... Dom Pedro II
1990: Barriga de Aluguel .... Ramiro
1990: Rainha da Sucata .... Conde Giacomo di Lampedusa
1992: Perigosas Peruas ....  Michelângelo
1992: Deus nos acuda .... Alberto
1992: Glückliche Reise
1993: Sonho Meu .... Varela
1994: Pátria Minha .... Cristiano
1994: A Viagem....  Juiz
1995: História de Amor .... Remador
1995: Engraçadinha... seus amores e seus pecados
1997: Anjo Mau .... Conrado Medeiros
1998: Torre de Babel ....  Dr. Navarro
1998: Labirinto .... Juiz

External links

1934 births
1999 deaths
Brazilian male film actors
Brazilian people of German descent
People from Belo Horizonte
20th-century Brazilian male actors